The Buckriders are a part of Belgian and Dutch folklore. They are ghosts or demons, who rode through the sky on the back of flying goats provided to them by a demon. During the 18th century, groups of thieves and other criminals co-opted the belief to frighten the inhabitants of southern Limburg, a province in the southern part of the Netherlands and eastern Belgium. Using the name "Bokkenrijders", these criminal bands launched raids across a region that includes southern Limburg, and parts of Germany and the Netherlands (parts of which were a part of the Southern Netherlands, currently Belgium). Commonly, the "Bokkenrijders" raided peaceful communities and farms. Several confessed "Bokkenrijders" were convicted and sentenced to death. Because of the link to the occult, authorities accused a large number of potentially innocent men of being "Bokkenrijders" and a number were tortured and subsequently convicted of crimes they denied having committed.

Etymology
Formally, the name Bokkenrijders was first publicly used in 1774, during the 'trial of Wellen', a town in the Belgian province of Limburg. Johan van Muysen slid a letter underneath the door of a farmer called Wouters. The letter contained a threat that Wouters's house would be burned down unless he paid up. Van Muyses claimed to be member of the buckriders and used the word Satan up to three times. In the trial of Wellen, the term “buckriders” is openly used against Philip Mertens, who wrote a similar threat letter.

History

Earliest records mentioning the buckriders originate from a tome called Oorzaeke, bewys en ondekkinge van een goddelooze, bezwoorne bende nagtdieven en knevelaers binnen de landen van Overmaeze en aenpalende landstreeken, which approximately translates to Causes, proof and discovery of a godless, averted gang of night thieves and gaggers within the lands of 'Overmaas' and adjacent regions. This book was written in 1779 by S.J.P. Sleinada (real name Pastor A. Daniels). This pastor, who lived in Landgraaf, knew several buckriders personally. The author tells us that these robbers made a pact with the Devil and rode their bucks at night. The common people told stories about them flying through the sky, pronouncing the following spell: 'Over huis, over tuin, over staak, en dat tot Keulen in de wijnkelder!' (across houses, across gardens, across stakes, even across Cologne into the wine cellar!). Once a year, they would visit their master, the Devil, on the 'Mookerheide'.

Later on, the buckriders held a reputation that resembles Robin Hood and his gang. The present interpretation is that a number of criminal gangs robbed houses and committed other crimes, using the myth to their advantage. Also, many of the buckriders that were arrested are thought to be innocent, as confessions were obtained through torture.

Raids and raiders
In Limburg, the buckriders are now embraced as part of cultural heritage.
Trials against buckriders differed from 'common trials against common criminals' if the suspect had performed a godless oath: 'I forswear God ... etc.' This so-called oath of heresy is a stereotypical aspect of the buckriders myth. Since the convicts were accused of their oath and pact with the devil, we can define this as a late form of witch-hunt. Prosecution of buckriders was as ruthless as the buckriders were themselves, even by those day's standards. 90% of the convicts received capital punishment. Confessions were given by means of torture, or by fear for it.

There are 7 periods of different buckrider raids. The first took place during 1743 - 1745, and the last during 1793 - 1794.

Known associated deaths
 Gabriël Brühl - sentenced to death by hanging, 10 September 1743.
 Geerling Daniels - died of two self-inflicted stab wounds, 28 January 1751.
 Joseph Kirchhoffs - sentenced to death by hanging, 11 May 1772.
 Joannes Arnold van de Wal ("Nolleke van Geleen") - sentenced to death by hanging, 21 September 1789.

Buckriders and witch-hunts
The fact that the buckriders were tried and prosecuted for their pact with the devil, resembles the witch-hunts during the Early Modern Period. Historians place these buckrider-hunts alongside other prosecuted 'godless' people: heretics and witches. These kinds of ruthless and fullscale trials last took place in Limburg.

Most of the crimes they were accused of, buckrider gangmembers never performed (such as the pact with the devil). There never was an organized central buckriders gang, but small separate groups.

References

External links
  De Bokkenrijders: gruwelijke misdaden én executies

Belgian legends
Dutch legends
European demons
German legends
Heerlen
Limburgian culture
Outlaw gangs
Supernatural legends